St James's Church is a Church of England parish church in Ashurst, West Sussex. The church is a grade I listed building and it dates from the early 12th century.

Present day
The parish of Ashurst is joined with St Andrew and St Cuthman, Steyning to form the joint benefice of Steyning and Ashurst. The benefice is in the Archdeaconry of Horsham in the Diocese of Chichester.

Notable burials
 Margaret Barber, English Christian writer under the pseudonym Michael Fairless

References

External links
 A Church Near You entry

Church of England church buildings in West Sussex
Grade I listed churches in West Sussex
13th-century church buildings in England